Michael Robertson (born 16 June 1982) is an Australian freestyle skier. He competed in the men's moguls event at the 2006 Winter Olympics.

References

External links
 

1982 births
Living people
Australian male freestyle skiers
Olympic freestyle skiers of Australia
Freestyle skiers at the 2006 Winter Olympics
People from Nathalia, Victoria